Karl Schmaderer (2 September 1914 – 14 June 2000) was an Austrian cyclist. Schmaderer competed in the team pursuit event at the 1936 Summer Olympics.

References

External links
 

1914 births
2000 deaths
Austrian male cyclists
Olympic cyclists of Austria
Cyclists at the 1936 Summer Olympics
Cyclists from Vienna